Entreposto is a Portuguese commercial and industrial group of companies. In 1982 it introduced Sado 550, a microcar with a 547cc two-cylinder Daihatsu AB20 engine. Around 500 were produced between 1982 and 1984, a few of which survive to this date.

External links/References  

Sado 550
Company site

Car manufacturers of Portugal